Eupselia is a moth genus of the family Depressariidae.

Species
 Eupselia anommata Turner, 1898
 Eupselia aristonica Meyrick, 1880
 Eupselia axiepaena Turner, 1947
 Eupselia beatella (Walker, 1864)
 Eupselia beltera Turner, 1947
 Eupselia callidyas Meyrick, 1915
 Eupselia carpocapsella (Walker, 1864)
 Eupselia holoxantha Lower, 1894
 Eupselia hypsichora Meyrick, 1906
 Eupselia iridizona Lower, 1899
 Eupselia isacta Meyrick, 1910
 Eupselia leucaspis Meyrick, 1906
 Eupselia melanostrepta Meyrick, 1880
 Eupselia metabola Turner, 1947
 Eupselia philomorpha Lower, 1902
 Eupselia satrapella Meyrick, 1880
 Eupselia syncapna Meyrick, 1920
 Eupselia theorella Meyrick, 1880
 Eupselia tristephana Meyrick, 1915

References

 
Hypertrophinae
Moth genera